Loyal Underwood (August 6, 1893 - September 30, 1966) was an American stock actor for Charlie Chaplin's film studio.

Biography
Born in 1893 in Rockford, Illinois, Underwood's movie debut was in The Count, a 1916 Chaplin short film created for the Mutual Film Corporation. Underwood is uncredited as he was for the four other Mutual shorts in which he appeared.

In 1918, Chaplin started work for First National and Loyal Underwood was on hand. He was credited and appeared in all seven First National Shorts which Chaplin directed.

Underwood was a short man. Hence, the comedy of a situation in which such a man is the antagonist; Chaplin's character routinely shrugged him off.

Between 1921 and 1927, Underwood appeared in several other lesser known films. In the next twenty years, he was again appearing uncredited in films, such as Arizona Bad Man, Let's Dance and The Paleface.

In 1928, Underwood worked as a writer and director at radio station KNX in Los Angeles.

Underwood's final film was a credited role, albeit a small one, as a Street Musician in Chaplin's final American film Limelight in 1952.

Underwood died in Los Angeles on September 30, 1966 in Southern California, and is buried in the Sheltering Hills section at Forest Lawn - Hollywood Hills Cemetery in Los Angeles, California. He was 73. Decades after his death, he lies in a still-unmarked curbside grave.

Filmography

References

External links

1893 births
1966 deaths
American male film actors
American male silent film actors
Burials at Forest Lawn Memorial Park (Hollywood Hills)
20th-century American male actors